Update: The Academy for Science and Design in 2023 will be moving from its current location at 486 Amherst Street to a new location at 9 Townsend West. Director Jennifer Cava and Rick Bartle stated it on November 30, 2022, at 5:40 pm.

The Academy for Science and Design (ASD) is a Blue-ribbon public charter school located in Nashua, New Hampshire, United States. It has been consistently ranked as among the top high schools in the United States, as well as the #1 school in the state of New Hampshire. ASD concentrates on providing a STEM-based education. The academy is tuition-free for New Hampshire residents. However, the limited space available for new students makes a lottery system necessary. All applicants who are eligible for the lottery (who completed the application requirements by the deadline) are drawn and this order is used to create the waiting list each year. The school is physically located in Nashua, but is a New Hampshire public school and all New Hampshire students are eligible to apply for enrollment. Nashua students are not given priority over students from any other New Hampshire towns.

ASD opened in September 2007 and is currently serving 525 students from over 40 New Hampshire communities in grades 6 through 12. The academy offers a science, technology, engineering and math oriented curriculum beginning with algebra, integrated biology and chemistry, and physics in grade 7.

History
The establishment of the school was approved in March 2006. Its establishment was sponsored by Daniel Webster College. The school opened for the 2007-08 academic year. During the 2011-12 year, grade 6 was added to the school. Prior to the 2012-13 school year, ASDNH moved from its original location in Merrimack, New Hampshire, to its current location in Nashua, expanding the size of the student body. On October 3, 2014, Dr. Scott F. Bobbitt donated $30,000 for the construction of a full chemistry lab, now officially named the Bobbitt lab after its donator. In 2015, the Academy for Science and Design was ranked the 50th best high school in America by Newsweek., and rose to 44th in 2016. It is currently ranked as the best high school in New Hampshire. On September 28, 2017, ten years after opening for their first year, the school won the National Blue Ribbon Schools award.

Curriculum
The academy's goal is to be internationally competitive. Algebra 1, Experimental Physics, and Integrated Biology and Chemistry are taught beginning in grade 7. Chemistry and biology are taught as a three-year course referred to as "Integrated Biology and Chemistry" or "IBC". Beginning in the 2018-2019 year, the course previously known as "IBC III" became known as "Chemistry Honors" to minimize confusion, and the course titled "IBC II" is now known as "Biology Honors" Starting in 2012, world history (now known as "Social Studies") and language arts are taught as a package course titled "Humanities". Technology and design are taught in dedicated courses as "Technology Design" and "Technology Applications in Society". Information technologies are integrated throughout the curriculum. In addition to the course load, the students are required to complete 150 community service hours as well as a junior internship comprising approximately 100 hours in the specialty that they have chosen. Student projects emphasize research skills and engineering. German, Latin, and Spanish are offered as the initial foreign languages.

Achievements
Mathcounts
First in 2014 Southern New Hampshire Regional Competition
First in 2015 Southern New Hampshire Regional Competition
FIRST Tech Challenge
First in The Wapack Northern New England FTC Championship, 2011
Destination Imagination
2013 New Hampshire State champions
Technology Student Association
2015 First Place New Hampshire Middle School
National Blue Ribbon Schools Award

See also

 The Founders Academy

References

External links 
 Official site

Public high schools in New Hampshire
Educational institutions established in 2007
Charter schools in New Hampshire
Schools in Hillsborough County, New Hampshire
Public middle schools in New Hampshire
Buildings and structures in Nashua, New Hampshire
2007 establishments in New Hampshire